The 1981–82 Liga Artzit season saw Hapoel Lod win the title and win promotion to Liga Leumit. Hapoel Ramat Gan and Maccabi Yavne were also promoted.

Maccabi Kiryat Gat, Beitar Netanya and Hapoel Tiberias were all relegated to Liga Alef.

Final table

References
Liga Artzit table Davar, 16.5.82, Historical Jewish Press 
Liga Artzit table Hadshot HaSport 16 May 1982, IFA

Liga Artzit seasons
Israel
2